Botswana has put a premium on economic and political integration in southern Africa. It has sought to make the Southern African Development Community (SADC) a working vehicle for economic development, and it has promoted efforts to make the region self-policing in terms of preventive diplomacy, conflict resolution, and good governance.  The SADC headquarters are located in Gaborone, the capital of Botswana.  It has welcomed post-apartheid South Africa as a partner in these efforts. Botswana joins the African consensus on most major international matters and is a member of international organizations, such as the United Nations and the African Union. Botswana is also a member of the International Criminal Court with a Bilateral Immunity Agreement of protection for the US-military (as covered under Article 98).

Botswana has a small number of diplomatic missions abroad.

Bilateral relations

Botswana and the Commonwealth of Nations

Botswana has been a republic in the Commonwealth of Nations since independence in 1966.

See also
 List of diplomatic missions in Botswana
 List of diplomatic missions of Botswana

Notes

References

External links
 Embassy of the Russian Federation in Gaborone 

 
Botswana and the Commonwealth of Nations